Formiminoglutamic acid (FIGLU; conjugate base, formiminoglutamate) is an intermediate in the catabolism of L-histidine to L-glutamic acid. It thus is also a biomarker for intracellular levels of folate. The FIGLU test is used to identify vitamin B₁₂ deficiency, folate deficiency, and liver failure or liver disease. It is elevated with folate trapping, where it is accompanied by decreased methylmalonic acid, increased folate and a decrease in homocysteine.

See also
 Formiminotransferase cyclodeaminase
 Glutamate-1-semialdehyde
 Glutamic acid
 Imidazol-4-one-5-propionic acid

References

Dicarboxylic acids
Amidines
Amino acid derivatives